KCD or kcd may refer to:

Karnatak College Dharwar, India
Kentucky Country Day School, US
Kincardineshire, historic county in Scotland, Chapman code
Kineo Collision Detector, a software library
Kingdom Come: Deliverance, a 2018 video game
kilocandela, 1000 candela